The Sarimanok (Pronunciation: sá·ri·ma·nók), also known as papanok in its feminine form, is a legendary bird of the Maranao people, who originate from Mindanao, an island in the Philippines, and part of Philippine mythology. It comes from the words sari and manok. Sari means "assorted" or "various", while manok originally meant "bird" as evidenced by early Spanish colonial sources, but came to mean only "chicken", which is how it is understood today (i.e. the creature is a "bird/chicken of assorted colors").

Description
The Sarimanok is  the legendary bird that has become an ubiquitous symbol of Maranao art. It is depicted as a fowl with colorful wings and feathered tail, holding a fish on its beak or talons. The head is profusely decorated with scroll, leaf, and spiral motifs. It is said to be a symbol of good fortune.

Origin

The Sarimanok is derived from a totem bird of the Maranao people, called Itotoro. According to the Maranao people, the Itotoro is a medium to the spirit world via its unseen twin spirit bird called Inikadowa.

According to the later Islamic legend, Muhammad found a rooster in the first of the seven heavens. The bird was so large its crest touched the second heaven. Its crow roused every living creature except man. The Day of Resurrection would come once this celestial rooster ceased to crow.

Cultural significance

According to the tradition, the sarimanok is never displayed by itself. It must be displayed with the set of flags, standards and vexilloids. At present, this is not totally true; sarimanok may be placed on the top of the umbrella of a Sultan or dignitary, and also, the Mindanao State University has adopted it for the graduation exercises following a non-traditional use.

Philippine National Artist for Visual Arts Abdulmari Asia Imao uses the Sarimanok as a motif for some of his artworks which helped popularize the creature.

The Far Eastern University seal bears the FEU Coat of Arms and the sarimanok motif. The FEU Coat of arms consists of eight-pointed golden star that represents the first eight main disciplines of FEU. The sarimanok is a legendary bird in full color that project the nationalistic spirit upon which the university is founded. The university wanted to have a Filipino touch in everything because they were one of the first universities in the Philippines to be founded by a Filipino, Dr. Nicanor Reyes, Sr.

The Philippine television network ABS-CBN used the Sarimanok in the network's 1993 station ID and served as the network's mascot from 1993 until 2000. It was first used during its color broadcasts in November 1966, similar to how NBC in the United States created their most famous symbol in 1956 for its color broadcasts: the peacock, which remains the company's official logo to this day. The Sarimanok was re-used in 2004 on plugs of its regional broadcasts.

The Philippine float entry for the 1998 Tournament of Roses Parade featured a giant 55-foot Sarimanok which also won the "Most Beautiful Float from Outside the USA” honors.

The Sarimanok was also the logo of Spirit of Manila Airlines, a short-lived airline which only lasted from 2011 to 2012.

See also
Okir
Fenghuang
Simurgh
Phoenix (mythology)

References

Mythological galliforms
Asian mythology
Philippine legendary creatures
Philippine literature
Culture of Lanao del Sur
Austronesian spirituality
Legendary birds